Bhimrao Panchale (30 March 1951) is a Marathi ghazal singer from the state of Maharashtra, India. He is known as Ghazal Nawaz (Prince of Ghazals) for his exposition of the ghazal and its adaptation to the Marathi language.

Career
After completing 8 years of training Bhimrao performed Sugam Sangeet in different parts of Maharashtra. He later began singing Urdu ghazal. He also sang Marathi ghazal to large audiences by conducting various mehfil in Maharashtra.

Bhimrao gave his first concert in Marathi ghazal in 1972.

He was closely linked with Ghazalkar Ilahi Jamadar.

In 2011, a felicitation concert was held in Mumbai, on the occasion of 60th birthday.

Panchale has been awarded  "Ekata kala Gaurav Puraskar" on 16th Jan 2016.

References

External links
http://www.afternoondc.in/film-review/marathi-ghazal-king-turns-sixty/article_21201
http://www.esakal.com/esakal/20110403/4825529712854582444.htm (in Marathi)
https://web.archive.org/web/20101110211752/http://esakal.com/esakal/20100722/5004558904219287758.htm (in Marathi)
https://web.archive.org/web/20110925233834/http://esakal.com/esakal/20110403/5600126776936862891.htm (in Marathi) 
(in Marathi) Sakal

1951 births
Living people
Marathi-language poets
People from Amravati
Indian male ghazal singers
Marathi-language singers
Indian male singer-songwriters
20th-century Indian male singers
20th-century Indian singers
Singers from Maharashtra